George Ivanov may refer to:
Georgi Ivanov (disambiguation)
George Ivanov (poet) (1894–1958)
Gjorge Ivanov (born 1960), Macedonian politician and the President of the Republic of Macedonia since 2009
Georges Ivanov (1902–1979), Russian-born French singer "Chante La Vieille Russie"